Crashletes is an American sports television program that premiered on Nickelodeon on July 5, 2016. The program is hosted by Rob Gronkowski, Brandon Broady, and Stevie Nelson.

Premise 
Brandon and Stevie, along with a guest host from the world of sports (e.g. basketball player DeAndre Jordan, snowboarder Shaun White, Olympic gymnast Laurie Hernandez, etc.) and an audience of kids, react to various viral videos of people failing at sports, which they call "crashletes." Each clip is shown in a package of about four to seven clips, and a recurring segment is the Crashdown (formerly known as the Gronkdown when Gronkowski was host), where a top 5 list of clips under a certain theming is shown.

Production 
Crashletes was renewed for a second season on September 1, 2016, and the second season premiered on September 16, 2016. Following a silent renewal, the third season was announced to premiere on TeenNick on February 11, 2018, but new episodes did not air in February 2018. On January 25, 2019, it was announced that the third season would premiere on February 3, 2019. The final ten episodes of the third season were released on CBS All Access on December 15, 2020.

Episodes

Series overview

Season 1 (2016)

Season 2 (2016–17)

Season 3 (2019–20)

Ratings 
 

| link2             = #Season 2 (2016–17)
| episodes2         = 21
| start2            = 
| end2              = 
| startrating2      = 1.22
| endrating2        = 0.93
| viewers2          = |2}} 

| link3             = #Season 3 (2019–20)
| episodes3         = 10
| start3            = 
| end3              = 
| startrating3      = 0.60
| endrating3        = 
| viewers3          = |2}} 
}}

References

External links 
 
 

2010s American children's television series
2010s American reality television series
2010s Nickelodeon original programming
2016 American television series debuts
2019 American television series endings
American children's reality television series
English-language television shows